Milan Ford (February 14, 1822 – August 22, 1900) was an American farmer from Oshkosh, Wisconsin who served two years as a Greenback member of the Wisconsin State Assembly from Winnebago County.

Background 
Ford was born in Kinsman, Ohio on February 14, 1822; received a common school
education, and became a Farmer by occupation. He came to Wisconsin in 1837, and settled in Winnebago County  near Oshkosh. He served as chairman of the Town of Nekimi, and held other local offices.

Assembly 
He was elected in 1877 from the 4th Assembly district of Winnebago County (the Towns of Nepeuskun, Nekimi, Poygan, Rushford, Utica, and Wolf River) as a Greenback, with 518 votes to 355 for Democrat E. B. Rounds and 261 for Republican George Slingsby (Republican incumbent Sidney Shufelt was not a candidate for re-election). He was assigned to the standing committee on federal relations, which he chaired (the Democrats and Republicans were almost tied in the Assembly, and the 13 Greenbacks and 1 socialist had a disproportionate influence as tiebreakers).

He was re-elected in 1878, with 660 votes against 536 for Republican Thomas J. Bowles. He was assigned to the committees on ways and means, and on the militia. He was not a candidate for re-election in 1879, and was succeeded by fellow Greenback David R. Bean.

Death
Ford died on August 22, 1900 in Nekimi, Wisconsin.

References 

1822 births
1900 deaths
Farmers from Wisconsin
Mayors of places in Wisconsin
Members of the Wisconsin State Assembly
People from Kinsman, Ohio
People from Winnebago County, Wisconsin
Wisconsin Greenbacks
19th-century American politicians